The Canadian territory of Yukon first required its residents to register their motor vehicles and display licence plates in 1914. Only rear plates have been required since 1990.

Passenger baseplates

1924 to 1979
The 1954 (dated 1955) issue was the first Yukon licence plate that complied with these standards.

1980 to present

Non-passenger plates

References

External links
Yukon Territory licence plates, 1969–present
A History of Yukon License Plates

Yukon
Transport in Yukon